The filum terminale ("terminal thread") is a delicate strand of fibrous tissue, about 20 cm in length, proceeding downward from the apex of the conus medullaris. It is one of the modifications of pia mater. It gives longitudinal support to the spinal cord and consists of two parts:
 The upper part, or filum terminale internum, is about 15 cm long and reaches as far as the lower border of the second sacral vertebra. It is continuous above with the pia mater and contained within a tubular sheath of the dura mater. In addition, it is surrounded by the nerves forming the cauda equina, from which it can be easily recognized by its bluish-white color.
 The lower part, or filum terminale externum, closely adheres to the dura mater. It extends downward from the apex of the tubular sheath and is attached to the back of the first segment of the coccyx in a structure sometimes referred to as the coccygeal ligament.

The most inferior of the spinal nerves, the coccygeal nerve leaves the spinal cord at the level of the conus medullaris via respective vertebrae through their intervertebral foramina, superior to the filum terminale. However, adhering to the outer surface of the filum terminale are a few strands of nerve fibres which probably represent rudimentary second and third coccygeal nerves. Furthermore, the central canal of the spinal cord extends 5 to 6 cm beyond the conus medullaris, downward into the filum terminale.

Additional Images

References

 Martini, F. Timmons, M. and Tallitsch, R. Human Anatomy. 5th ed. San Francisco: Pearson/Benjamin Cummings, 2006.

External links
 
 
  - "Vertebral Canal and Spinal Cord: Regions of the Spinal Cord"
 

Meninges